"Tomorrow Wendy" is a song written and originally recorded by American singer-songwriter Andy Prieboy. Released in 1990 as the lead single from his first solo album ...Upon My Wicked Son, Prieboy recorded the song as a duet with Johnette Napolitano. In 1990, Napolitano would also record the song with her band Concrete Blonde for their third studio album Bloodletting.

Writing
"Tomorrow Wendy" was inspired by the suicide of a woman who Prieboy had known from a young age when they were both growing up in East Chicago, Indiana. Wendy later turned to prostitution and drugs, and when she was diagnosed with HIV, she decided to commit suicide by taking a heroin overdose rather than go on to die of an AIDS-related disease. Prieboy told the Los Angeles Times in 1991, 

Prieboy also took inspiration from the economic state of his hometown when writing the song. He told the Los Angeles Times in 1990, "It's also about the death of a city in the Industrial Age. Places like Gary and Pittsburgh were once the backbones of America, and now it's like the Depression all over again. People have lost their homes – it's the end of a way of life. And there's lots of Wendys out there." The deaths of Prieboy's two grandfathers from cancer was part of the inspiration behind Wendy's questioning of faith in the song, "I watched them go through a long period of rage and anger and atheism, railing at the God they'd worshiped all their life. Sooner or later, they accepted it. Wendy never accepted it."

Prieboy began writing "Tomorrow Wendy" while touring with his band Wall of Voodoo. He wrote a total of 27 verses for the song and then whittled them down to three.

Recording
Prieboy recorded "Tomorrow Wendy" for his first solo album ...Upon My Wicked Son. He felt the song needed a woman's voice in addition to his own and contacted Napolitano, who agreed to provide vocals on the track. Napolitano recalled in 1990, "Andy called me to sing 'Tomorrow Wendy' with him, and I did it, and as I listened to it and listened to it and listened to it I thought, 'This is really important, and the words are incredible'."

Music video
The song's music video was directed by Thomas Mignone and produced by Darci A. Oitman for DOOM Inc. The footage of Prieboy and Napolitano performing the song was shot in Hollywood, whereas the street scenes were shot on location in Hammond, East Chicago and Calumet City. Initially it was intended to shoot the entire video in Hollywood, with Prieboy showing Mignone sketches of the sort of industrial and street scenes he wanted in the video based on his memories of the Calumet Region. Prieboy then suggested that he and the film crew fly out to shoot the footage on location.

Critical reception
On its release, Andrew Mueller of Melody Maker described "Tomorrow Wendy" as an "uncharacteristically restrained lament for a wearied prostitute as she contemplates death". He added, "Prieboy seems to fancy reinventing himself as a street-level songwriter type with dirt under his nails and holes in his trousers and all that type of thing. The reasonably good news is that, on this evidence, his attempts to do so could well be highly listenable."

Formats

Concrete Blonde version

In 1990, American alternative rock band Concrete Blonde released their own version of the song on their third studio album Bloodletting. It was released the following year as the fourth and final single from the album, and reached number 66 on Canada's RPM 100 chart in February 1991.

After recording the vocals on Prieboy's version, Napolitano was so moved by the song that she asked for permission to record the song with Concrete Blonde. Napolitano told the Vancouver Sun in 1990, "It was such an intensely important song, I just felt I had to do it [with Concrete Blonde]." She added to The Sydney Morning Herald, "It's probably the most depressing subject we've ever covered but it's just so vital that the message gets across." Prieboy played keyboards on the band's version.

"Tomorrow, Wendy" was the closing track on Bloodletting because the band considered it to be "the blackest song on the record". Through Bloodletting, Concrete Blonde's version of the song preceded the release of Prieboy's recording by a couple of months.

Critical reception
In a review of Bloodletting, Steve Terrell of The Santa Fe New Mexican described "Tomorrow, Wendy" as "one of the most haunting songs" on the album, with the song maintaining "an atmosphere of sadness and impending doom". In a retrospective review, Ned Raggett of AllMusic noted that Concrete Blonde's version sees Napolitano "deliver [a] bravura performance of the bitter, heartbreaking lyric".

Personnel
Credits are adapted from the Bloodletting CD album booklet.

Concrete Blonde
 Johnette Napolitano – vocals
 James Mankey – guitars
 Paul Thompson – drums

Additional musicians
 Andy Prieboy – keyboards
 Gail Ann Dorsey – bass

Production
 Concrete Blonde, Chris Tsangarides – producers
 Chris Marshall – production assistance
 Earle Mankey, James Mankey – additional recording and mixing

Charts

Controversy
Both Prieboy's and Concrete Blonde's versions of "Tomorrow Wendy" generated some controversy on release. Prieboy and Napolitano received hate mail by those who considered the song to be anti-Christian. Prieboy dismissed the accusations and told the Los Angeles Times in 1991, "It's not an anti-Christian song in the least. It's just an accurate depiction of someone who's dying without hope, without faith, without family and without friends." Napolitano commented, "To me [the song is] just asking. It's not saying, 'God, you're a bad person.' It's just wondering why." A number of complaints were also received when some US radio stations began playing Concrete Blonde's version.

Live performances
When Prieboy was the opening act for Concrete Blonde in 1990–91, he and Napolitano would perform "Tomorrow Wendy" together. A live performance was recorded in a session for Australian radio station Triple J on 28 November 1990. It was included on the various artists compilation album JJJ Live at the Wireless in 1991. At future concerts, Prieboy would perform the song solo. He told The Age in 1993, "If Johnette [is] not there to sing 'Tomorrow Wendy' I sing it solo. It's a space I reserve for Miss J, she really lifted that song."

A live version by Concrete Blonde, recorded at the Malibu Nightclub in Long Island, was included on the US CD single release of their 1990 song "Caroline". It has also appeared on their 1994 compilation album Still in Hollywood and as a bonus track on the 2010 20th anniversary edition of Bloodletting.

References

1990 songs
1990 debut singles
1991 singles
Concrete Blonde songs
I.R.S. Records singles
Songs about suicide
Songs about HIV/AIDS
Male–female vocal duets